Sympistis sokar is a moth of the family Noctuidae. It is found in Arizona.

External links
 Images at mothphotographersgroup

sorapis
Moths described in 2008